Marx Augustin (also Markus Augustin, "Der Liebe Augustin") (1643 in Vienna – 11 March 1685 (or 10 October 1705), in Vienna) was an Austrian minstrel, bagpiper, and improvisatory poet most famous for the song, "O du lieber Augustin", which is attributed to him.

References
Greatest Hits, 1820-60 (Variety Music Cavalcade).  Accessed 11 June 2009.

1643 births
1685 deaths
1705 deaths
Year of death uncertain
17th-century Austrian musicians
17th-century Austrian people
Austrian male musicians
17th-century Austrian poets
Austrian male poets
Bagpipe players
Musicians from Vienna
17th-century male writers
17th-century male musicians